John R. Gribbin (born 19 March 1946) is a British science writer, an astrophysicist, and a visiting fellow in astronomy at the University of Sussex. His writings include quantum physics, human evolution, climate change, global warming, the origins of the universe, and biographies of famous scientists. He also writes science fiction.

Biography 

John Gribbin graduated with his bachelor's degree in physics from the University of Sussex in 1966. Gribbin then earned his Master of Science (MSc) degree in astronomy in 1967, also from the Univ. of Sussex, and he earned his PhD in astrophysics from the University of Cambridge (1971).

In 1968, Gribbin worked as one of Fred Hoyle's research students at the Institute of Theoretical Astronomy, and wrote a number of stories for New Scientist about the Institute's research and what were eventually discovered to be pulsars.

In 1974, Gribbin, along with Stephen Plagemann, published a book titled The Jupiter Effect, which predicted that the alignment of the planets in a quadrant on one side of the Sun on 10 March 1982 would cause gravitational effects that would trigger earthquakes in the San Andreas Fault, possibly wiping out Los Angeles and its suburbs.
Gribbin distanced himself from The Jupiter Effect in the 17 July 1980, issue of New Scientist magazine, stating that he had been "too clever by half".

In February 1982, he and Plagemann published The Jupiter Effect Reconsidered, claiming that the 1980 Mount St. Helens eruption proved their theory true despite a lack of planetary alignment.  In 1999, Gribbin repudiated it, saying "I don't like it, and I'm sorry I ever had anything to do with it."

In 1984, Gribbin published In Search of Schrödinger's Cat: Quantum Physics and Reality. The Spectator Book Club described it as among the best of the first wave of physics popularisations preceding Stephen Hawking's multi-million-selling A Brief History of Time. Gribbin's book was cited by BBC World News as an example of how to revive an interest in the study of mathematics.

In 2006, Gribbin took part in a BBC radio 4 broadcast as an "expert witness". Presenter Matthew Parris discussed with Professor Kathy Sykes and Gribbin whether Albert Einstein "really was a 'crazy genius.

At the 2009 World Conference of Science Journalists, the Association of British Science Writers presented Gribbin with their Lifetime Achievement award.

Critical response to Gribbin's writings

The conservative political magazine The Spectator described Gribbin as "one of the finest and most prolific writers of popular science around" in a review of Science: A History, which it praises as "the product of immense learning, and a lifetime spent working out how to write in a vivacious way about science and scientists".

Henry Gee, a senior editor at Nature, described Gribbin as "one of the best science writers around".

A review of The Universe: A Biography in the journal Physics World praised his skill in explaining difficult ideas.

A Wall Street Journal review of Flower Hunters (co-authored with Mary Gribbin) described the writing as "pedestrian", with plenty of domestic detail but a failure to convey a larger cultural context. It stated that the book's chapter-length biographical sketches are too often superficial, and criticised the book for glaring omissions of prominent plant collectors.

In a review of The Reason Why, the Times Higher Education states that Gribbin writes on speculative matters and presents some of his theories without supporting evidence, but noted his comprehensive research and lyrical writing.

Works

Science
 (1999) Almost Everyone's Guide to Science: The Universe, Life, and Everything, Yale University Press, 
 (1999) Get a Grip on New Physics, Weidenfeld & Nicolson, London. 
 (1999) The Little Book of Science, Barnes and Noble, 
 (2003) Science: A History 1543–2001, Gardners Books, 
 (2003) The Scientists: A History of Science Told Through the Lives of Its Greatest Inventors, Random House, 
 (2006) The Fellowship: The Story of a Revolution, Allen Lane,  (the story of the Royal Society)
 (2006) History of Western Science, 1543-2001, Folio Society, London [2nd edition of Science: A History, 1543-2001, with minor amendments and a new preface by the author].
 (2009) Flower Hunters, Oxford University Press, with Mary Gribbin, 320 pages, 
 (2010) In Search of the Multiverse: Parallel Worlds, Hidden Dimensions, and the Ultimate Quest for the Frontiers of Reality, Wiley,

Children's books on science
 (2000) Eyewitness: Time & Space, DK Children, 
 (2003) Big Numbers: A Mind Expanding Trip to Infinity and Back (coauthor Mary Gribbin), Wizard Books (children's imprint of Icon Books) 2005 edition 
 (2003) How far is up? : Measuring the Size of the Universe (coauthor Mary Gribbin), Icon Books, 2005 edition 
 (2008) Time Travel for Beginners (coauthor Mary Gribbin), Hodder Children's,

Predictions
 (1974) The Jupiter Effect: The Planets As Triggers of Devastating Earthquakes (coauthor Stephen H. Plageman), Random House ; revised edition published as The Jupiter Effect Reconsidered, Vintage Books (New York, NY), 1982. 
 (February 1982) The Jupiter Effect Reconsidered
 (1983) Beyond the Jupiter Effect, Macdonald,

The Sun
 (1980) The Death of the Sun, Dell Publishing  (also as The Strangest Star: The Scientific Account of the Life and Death of the Sun, 1980, Athlone Press)
 (1991) Blinded by the Light: The Secret Life of the Sun, Bantam,

Quantum physics
 (1984) In Search of Schrödinger's Cat: Quantum Physics and Reality, Bantam Books,  (reprinted in 2012 by Random House )
 (1996) Schrödinger's Kittens and the Search for Reality, Back Bay Books, 
 (1998) Q Is for Quantum: An Encyclopedia of Particle Physics, Free Press, 
 (2002) Quantum Physics (Essential Science), Dorling Kindersley, 
 (2007)  La physique quantique, Pearson Education, 
 (2014) Computing with Quantum Cats: From Colossus to Qubits, Prometheus Books, 
 (2019) Six Impossible Things: The 'Quanta of Solace' and the Mysteries of the Subatomic World, Icon Books,

Evolution and human genetics
 (1982) The Monkey Puzzle: A Family Tree (coauthor Jeremy Cherfas), Pantheon Books, 
 (1988) The One Percent Advantage: The Sociobiology of Being Human, Blackwell Publishers, 
 (1990) Children of the Ice: Climate and Human Origins, Blackwell Publishers (with Mary Gribben) 
 (1993) Being Human: Putting People in an Evolutionary Perspective, J.M .Dent & Sons (with Mary Gribben) 
 (1985) In Search of the Double Helix, McGraw-Hill, 
 (1985) The Redundant Male: Is Sex Irrelevant in the Modern World? (coauthor Jeremy Cherfas) Paladin,  
 (2003) The Mating Game, (revised edition of The Redundant Male) Barnes and Noble, 
 (2003) The First Chimpanzee: In Search of Human Origins, (coauthor Jeremy Cherfas) Barnes and Noble,

Climate change and other concerns
 (1975) Our Changing Climate, Faber and Faber, 
 (1976) Forecasts, Famines, and Freezes: Climates and Man's Future, Wildwood House Ltd, 
 (1977) Our Changing Planet, Wildwood House Limited 
 (1978) Climatic Change, Cambridge University Press 
 (1978) The climatic threat: What's wrong with our weather?, Fontana 
 (1979) Climate and Mankind, Earthscan, 56 pp 
 (1979) This Shaking Earth (aka Earthquakes & Volcanoes) Sidgwick & Jackson, 
 (1979) Weather Force: Climate and Its Impact on Our World, (co-author: John Man) Putnam Pub Group, 
 (1981) Carbon Dioxide, Climate, and Man, Intl Inst for Environment, 64 pp. 
 (1982) Future Weather and the Greenhouse Effect, Delacorte Press, 
 (1985) Weather, Macdonald Education, 48 pp. 
 (1986) The Breathing Planet, (editor) Blackwell Publishers, 
 (1988) The Hole in the Sky: Man's Threat to the Ozone Layer (rev. ed, 1993) Bantam, 
 (1989) Winds of Change, Hodder Arnold, 
 (1990) Hothouse Earth: The Greenhouse Effect and Gaia, Random House, 
 (1992) Too Hot to Handle? Greenhouse Effect, Corgi, 
 (1996) Watching the Weather, Trafalgar Square, 
 (2018) "Alone in the Milky Way: Why we are probably the only intelligent life in the galaxy", Scientific American, vol. 319, no. 3 (September 2018), pp. 94–99.

Astronomy and description of the Universe
 (1976) Astronomy for the Amateur, Macmillan, 
 (1976) Our Changing Universe: The New Astronomy, Dutton, 
 (1977) White Holes: Cosmic Gushers in the Universe, Delacorte Press/E. Friede, 
 (1979) Timewarps, Delacorte Press/E. Friede, 
 (1981) Future Worlds, Springer, 
 (1982) Cosmology Today, (editor and contributor) IPC Media, 
 (1983) Spacewarps: Black Holes, White Holes, Quasars, and the Universe, Delta,  
 (1988) The Omega Point: The Search for the Missing Mass and the Ultimate Fate of the Universe , Bantam, 
 (1989) Cosmic Coincidences: Dark Matter, Mankind, and Anthropic Cosmology, Bantam, 
 (1992) In Search of the Edge of Time: Black Holes, White Holes, Worm Holes, Bantam Books,  (US title Unveiling the Edge of Time, Three Rivers Press. 1994 reprint)
 (1994) Time and Space, as Eyewitness: Time and Space, (2000) DK Children, 
 (1996) Companion to the Cosmos, John and Mary Gribbin, Little:  
 (1997) Time and the Universe (Whats the Big Idea), (children's) Hodder & Stoughton, 
 (1998) The Case of the Missing Neutrinos: And Other Phenomena of the Universe, Fromm Intl. 
 (1998) The Search for Superstrings, Symmetry, and the Theory of Everything, Little, Brown and Company, 
 (1998) Watching the Universe, Constable, 
 (2001) Space: Our Final Frontier, BBC Books, 
 (2001) Hyperspace: The Universe and Its Mysteries, (also pub as Space: Our Final Frontier) DK ADULT, 
 (2008) Galaxies: A Very Short Introduction, Oxford University Press, USA. 
 (2007) The Universe: A Biography, Allen Lane, 
 (2008) From Here to Infinity: The Royal Observatory Greenwich Guide to Astronomy, (with Mary Gribbin) National Maritime Museum, ; republished in 2009 as From Here to Infinity: A Beginner's Guide to Astronomy, Sterling 
 (2011) Alone in the Universe: Why Our Planet Is Unique, John Wiley & Sons, 
 (2016) Einstein's Masterwork: 1915 and the General Theory of Relativity, Pegasus Books

Origins of the Universe
 (1976) Galaxy Formation: A Personal View, Wiley, 
 (1982) Genesis: The Origins of Man and the Universe, Delacorte Press, 
 (1986) In Search of the Big Bang, Bantam, 
 (1993) In the Beginning: The Birth of the Living Universe (In the Beginning, Viking, 
 (1994) In the Beginning: After COBE and before the Big Bang, Bulfinch Press, 
 (1997) Origins: Our Place in Hubble's Universe, Constable and Robinson  (as Empire of the Sun, '98; as Cosmos '06)
 (2001) The Birth of Time: How Astronomers Measured the Age of the Universe, Yale University Press,  (2009 edition )
 (2004) Deep Simplicity: Bringing Order To Chaos And Complexity, Random House, 2004, 
 (2015) 13.8: The Quest to Find the True Age of the Universe and the Theory of Everything, Icon Books,

Novels
 (1980) The Sixth Winter (with ) (novel) Simon & Schuster 
 (1982) Brother Esau (with Douglas Orgill) (novel) Harper & Row 
 (1988) Double Planet (with Marcus Chown) (novel) Victor Gollancz 
 (1990) Father to the Man (novel) Tor Books 
 (1991) Ragnarok (with D.G. Compton) (novel) Gollancz 
 (1991) Reunion (with Marcus Chown) (novel) Gollancz 
 (1993) Innervisions (novel) Penguin Books 
 (2009) Timeswitch (novel) PS Publishing 
 (2011) The Alice Encounter (novella) PS Publishing

Biographies
 (1992) Stephen Hawking: A Life in Science (coauthor Michael White), National Academies Press , 2002 edition: 
 (1993) Einstein : A Life in Science, (coauthor Michael White) Simon & Schuster 
 (1995) Darwin: A Life in Science, (coauthor Michael White) Dutton Adult 
 (1997) Darwin in 90 Minutes, (with Mary Gribbin)  Constable and Robinson  (Part of a series including: Curie , Einstein , Faraday , Galileo , Halley , Mendel , Newton )
 (1997) Richard Feynman: A Life in Science, (coauthor Mary Gribbin) Penguin Books 
 (2003) FitzRoy: The Remarkable Story of Darwin's Captain and the Invention of the Weather Forecast, Yale University Press 
 (2005) Annus Mirabilis: 1905, Albert Einstein, and the Theory of Relativity, (coauthor Mary Gribbin) Chamberlain Bros.  (includes DVD)
 (2009) He Knew He Was Right: The Irrepressible Life of James Lovelock and Gaia (co-author Mary Gribbin), Allen Lane. 
 (2013) Erwin Schrodinger and the Quantum Revolution, Wiley,

References

External links 

  (archived in 2012)
 John Gribbin's old homepage at Sussex University
 John Gribbin: Penguin UK author profile
 Brief interview  by American Scientist magazine, 2005
John Gribbin entry at Encyclopedia of literature and science
John Gribbin at Kirkus Reviews

1946 births
Living people
20th-century apocalypticists
21st-century apocalypticists
Alumni of the University of Sussex
Academics of the University of Sussex
British physicists
British science writers
Fellows of the Royal Society of Literature
People from Maidstone
Philosophers of cosmology
Philosophers of time